The 2007 Copa Colsanitas Santander was a women's tennis tournament played on outdoor clay courts. It was the 10th edition of the Copa Colsanitas, and was part of the Tier III Series of the 2007 WTA Tour. It took place at the Club Campestre El Rancho in Bogotá, Colombia, from 19 February through 25 February 2007. Sixth-seeded Roberta Vinci won the singles title and earned $25,840 first-prize money.

Finals

Singles

 Roberta Vinci defeated  Tathiana Garbin, 6–7(5–7), 6–4, 0–3 ret.
 It was Roberta Vinci's first career title.

Doubles

 Lourdes Domínguez Lino /  Paola Suárez defeated  Flavia Pennetta /  Roberta Vinci, 1–6, 6–3, 11–9

References

External links
 Official website
 ITF tournament edition details
 Tournament draws

Copa Colsanitas
Copa Colsanitas
2007 in Colombian tennis